John Appleton (1815–1864) was an American Assistant Secretary of State and Democratic Party politician from Maine.

John Appleton is also the name of:

 John Appleton (academic), Master of University College, Oxford, England (c. 1401–8)
 John E. C. Appleton (1905–1990), Australian theatre and radio producer
 John F. Appleton (1838–1870), American Civil War general from Maine
 John James Appleton (1792–1864), diplomat for the United States
 John Appleton (judge) (1804–1891), Justice of the Maine Supreme Judicial Court 
 John Howard Appleton (1844–1930), American chemist

See also 
 Jon Appleton (born 1939), American composer, author and professor of music
 
 Appleton (disambiguation)